Multivariate Behavioral Research is a peer-reviewed academic journal published by Taylor & Francis Group on behalf of the Society of Multivariate Experimental Psychology. The editor-in-chief is Peter Molenaar (Pennsylvania State University). Its 2017 impact factor is 3.691.

External links

Taylor & Francis academic journals
English-language journals
Statistics journals
Bimonthly journals
Publications established in 1966
Mathematical and statistical psychology journals
Academic journals associated with learned and professional societies